Ireneusz is a Polish male given name that comes from the Greek eirenaios.

Ireneusz is a given name. Notable people with the name include:

Ireneusz Ciurzyński, Polish sprint canoeist who competed in the mid-1980s
Ireneusz Jeleń (born 1981), Polish footballer who plays as a right-winger or striker
Ireneusz Krosny (born 1968), Polish actor and mime artist
Ireneusz Kwieciński, Polish judoka
Ireneusz Marcinkowski (born 1977), Polish footballer
Ireneusz Paliński (1932–2006), Polish weightlifter
Ireneusz Raś (born 1972), Polish politician
Ireneusz Socha (born 1964), drummer, composer

See also
Irenaeus
Ireneos